Yasser Ibrahim Farag (born May 2, 1984) is an Egyptian athlete competing in the shot put and discus throw events.

Biography
He has also taken part in discus throw competitions. In 2003 he was the Egyptian champion in both shot put and discus throw.

His personal best shot put is 19.87 metres, achieved in July 2008 in Ústí nad Labem. In the discus throw he has 61.58 metres, achieved at the 2007 All-Africa Games.

Competition record

References

External links
 

1984 births
Living people
Athletes (track and field) at the 2008 Summer Olympics
Egyptian male discus throwers
Egyptian male shot putters
Olympic athletes of Egypt
African Games gold medalists for Egypt
African Games medalists in athletics (track and field)
Mediterranean Games bronze medalists for Egypt
Mediterranean Games medalists in athletics
Athletes (track and field) at the 2003 All-Africa Games
Athletes (track and field) at the 2007 All-Africa Games
Athletes (track and field) at the 2011 All-Africa Games
Athletes (track and field) at the 2005 Mediterranean Games
Athletes (track and field) at the 2009 Mediterranean Games
Athletes (track and field) at the 2013 Mediterranean Games
Islamic Solidarity Games competitors for Egypt
African Championships in Athletics winners